The Men's 3 m synchro springboard competition of the 2020 European Aquatics Championships was held on 13 May 2021.

Results
The final was started at 19:30.

References

Men's 3 m synchro springboard